Paige Maurine Sauer (born December 8, 1977) is a former professional basketball player.

High school
Sauer attended Carl Albert High School in Midwest City, Oklahoma. She was class president and helped the school's team win a state championship.

College
While playing at University of Connecticut, Sauer was a member of four Big East Tournament Championship teams and four Big East regular season titles. She graduated with a bachelor's degree in psychology.

International basketball
Sauer played basketball in Spain, France, Hungary, and South Korea. She spent three years playing internationally.

See also
List of Connecticut Huskies in the WNBA Draft

References

External links
UCONN Hoop Legends: PAIGE SAUER
Northern Colorado - Paige Sauer

1977 births
Living people
American women's basketball players
Basketball players from Nevada
Basketball players from Oklahoma
Centers (basketball)
Cleveland Rockers players
Fairfield University faculty
Los Angeles Sparks draft picks
Los Angeles Sparks players
People from Midwest City, Oklahoma
Sportspeople from Reno, Nevada
UConn Huskies women's basketball players
University of Northern Colorado faculty
American women academics